This list of Negro league baseball teams is split into two pages, one listing the major league Negro teams and one listing the minor league and traveling Negro teams.  Some teams are included in both lists.

List of major Negro league baseball teams
List of minor Negro league baseball teams

Negro league baseball teams
Negro league baseball
 
Negro league